Byomkesh O Chiriyakhana is 2016 Indian Thriller film on Bengali fictional detective Byomkesh Bakshi. The role of Byomkesh Bakshi is portrayed by Jisshu Sengupta. The film is directed by Anjan Dutt. This is the fifth installment of Byomkesh series by Anjan Dutt, serving as a sequel to Byomkesh Bakshi. The film is based on Chiriyakhana by Sharadindu Bandyopadhyay.

Cast
Jisshu Sengupta as Byomkesh Bakshi
Saswata Chatterjee as Ajit Bandyopadhyay
Ushasie Chakraborty as Satyabati
Shantilal Mukherjee as Nishanath Sen
Dulal Lahiri as Nepal Gupta
Priyanka Sarkar as Banalaxmi
Saayoni Ghosh as Mukul 
Riju Biswas as Bijoy Sen
Neel Mukherjee (actor) as Dr. Bhujangadhar
Kanchan Mullick as Mushkil Miya
Sagnik Chatterjee as Brajadas
Ankita Chakraborty as Damayanti
Kanchana Moitra    as Najar Bibi
Mrinal Mukherjee  as Ramen Lahiri
Subhra Sourav Das  as Panugopal
Anjan Dutt as Kokonad Gupta (cameo)

Sequel
Anjan Dutt's cameo in this film as Kokonad Gupta, hints the sequel will be based on the story Agnibaan by Sharadindu Bandyopadhyay.

See also
 Abar Byomkesh

References

External links
Telegraph India
 

Bengali-language Indian films
2010s Bengali-language films
2016 films
Indian thriller films
Indian detective films
Films directed by Anjan Dutt
Byomkesh Bakshi films
2016 thriller films
Films based on works by Saradindu Bandopadhyay